Fenderesk-e Shomali Rural District is a rural district (dehestan) in Fenderesk District, Ramian County, Golestan Province, Iran. At the 2006 census, its population was 7,176, in 1,752 families.  The rural district has 8 villages.

References 

Rural Districts of Golestan Province
Ramian County